Raja Muhammad Abbas (born 20 December 1953) is a retired Pakistani civil servant who served in BPS-22 grade as the Federal Secretary Ministry of Interior, Board of Investment, & Ministry of Housing & Works. Interior Secretary of Pakistan and Chief Secretary Sindh. Abbas belongs to the Pakistan Administrative Service and was a part of Pakistan Navy before joining the elite civil services.

Career
Abbas served as Chief Secretary Sindh when Prime Minister Yousuf Raza Gillani appointed him to the post in 2011. He has also served as Federal Secretary for the Ministry of Interior, Board of Investment, & Ministry of Housing and Works.

At the provincial level, Abbas had served as Secretary Labour, Transport, & Industries to the Government of Sindh. He had also served as Director General Lahore Development Authority and Parks and Horticulture Authority in Government of Punjab. Moreover, he had also headed key districts of Punjab as Deputy Commissioner of Faisalabad, Jhelum, and Gujranwala.

Currently, he is director on the board of several companies; mainly including Askari Bank Ltd, Sindh Insurance Ltd and Sindh Leasing Company.

See also
 Government of Pakistan
 Pakistan Administrative Service
 Lahore Development Authority
 Parks and Horticulture Authority
 Askari Bank

References

1953 births
Living people
Pakistani civil servants
Government of Pakistan
Pakistani government officials